The Almy D. Coggleshall Plotter Kill Preserve is a  nature reserve and hiking area located on Route 159 in the town of Rotterdam, Schenectady County, New York State.

Etymology
Plotter Kill is most likely a corruption of "platte kill", which is also found in Ulster County. "Platte" is Dutch for "flat", and kill denotes stream or creek.

General description

The preserve is named after Almy D. Coggleshall, who was central in creating the trail at Plotter Kill while a member of the Schenectady County Environmental Advisory Council. In 1990 the preserve was renamed in his honor. While the preserve is a forest containing a mixture of hardwood and conifers, its main feature is the Plotter Kill gorge. The gorge was cut by melt waters at the close of the ice ages approximately 10,000 years ago. There are three waterfalls in the preserve, the Upper, the Lower and the Rynex Creek Falls.

Natural history

Many of the flat rock layers, exposed by water flow and erosion over the last 20,000 years, were originally formed during the Mohawkian age of the Ordovician period, approximately 450 million years ago. These layers appear rectangular, featuring orthogonal joint sets.

The Plotter Kill Preserve is ideal for nature study and is used by local schools and Boy Scout troops. The preserve is a mixture of native hardwoods and conifers including several species of pine, oak, birch and maple.  Over 600 species of plants have been found in the area including: trilliums, violets, lilies, ferns and club mosses. There is also an abundance of both animal and bird life, with garter snakes, chipmunks and amphibians such as frogs and salamanders often seen. There are also an undocumented number of different species of toad stools and other varieties of fungi.

In literature

The falls are mentioned in the journals of Samson Occam Mohegan (1723 - 1792). The entry for Wednesday 29 November 1786 reads "Some time after breakfast Mr Henry Fero and I went to see the falls and it is a grand sight, the power of God is to be seen here."

The trailhead

The trailhead and general access is located on Mariaville Road (route 159). To reach it leave Interstate I890 at exit 2A (Campbell Road) and follow the signs for Rotterdam Square Mall. The parking area for the preserve is located on the right approximately  after turning onto Route 159.

References

External links
 Schenectady County web site

Nature reserves in New York (state)
Protected areas of Schenectady County, New York
Tributaries of the Hudson River
Landforms of Schenectady County, New York
Rivers of Schenectady County, New York